Telic may refer to:
Grammatically, indicating telicity
A central argument of Teleology says that the world has clearly been constructed in a purposeful telic rather than a chaotic manner, and must therefore have been made by a rational being, i.e. God
"Operation Telic", the codename for the British military participation in the 2003 Iraq War